Mead Corp. v. Tilley, 490 U.S. 714 (1989), is a US labor law case, concerning occupational pensions.

Facts

Judgment
Justice Thurgood Marshall, writing for the Court, held that only after an employer has met PBGC conditions to fund plans can it recoup ‘excess’ funds that would not need to cover promised benefits.

Justice John P. Stevens dissented.

See also

United States labor law

References

External links
 

United States labor case law
United States Supreme Court cases
United States Supreme Court cases of the Rehnquist Court
1989 in United States case law
Employee Retirement Income Security Act of 1974